Shank's mare (and numerous variants, e.g.: shanks mare, shanks's mare, shanks's nag, shanks-nag, 
shanks's pony) is an expression, primarily found in the United Kingdom, that refers to walking.

Shank's mare may also refer to:
Tōkaidōchū Hizakurige (written in 12 parts between 1765 and 1831), a Japanese comic picaresque novel (kokkeibon) by Jippensha Ikku, known in translation as Shank's Mare